Knights of Saint George appear at different historical periods and in different countries as mutually independent bodies having nothing in common but the veneration of Saint George, the patron saint of knighthood.

Saint George of Lydda, a martyr of the persecution of Diocletian in the 4th century, is one of those military saints whom Byzantine iconography represented as a horseman armed wiktionary:cap-a-pie, like the flower of the Roman armies after the military reform of Justinian I in the 6th century. The pilgrim knights of Europe, encountering in the East these representations of Saint George, recognised their own accoutrements and at once adopted him as the patron of their noble calling.

This popularity of Saint George in the West gave rise to numerous associations both secular and religious. Among secular orders of this name which still exist must be mentioned the English Order of the Garter, which has always had Saint George for its patron. The Kingdom of Aragon was placed under his patronage, and in gratitude for his assistance to its armies King Peter II of Aragon founded (1201) the Order of Saint George of Alfama in the district of that name. Nevertheless, this order received the approbation of the Holy See only in 1363 and had but a brief existence. With the approval of antipope Benedict XIII, it was amalgamated with the Aragonese Order of Montesa, and thereafter known as the Order of Montesa and Saint George of Alfama.

See also
Spanish military orders

Jorge
San Jorge d'Alfama, Order of
Military units and formations of the Reconquista
Catholic orders of chivalry
History of Catholicism in Spain